Antonio Ubaldo Rattín (born May 16, 1937) is a former Argentine football player, best known as a Boca Juniors midfielder, and because of an incident in a match at the 1966 FIFA World Cup.

Rattín remains as one of the greatest idols of Boca Juniors, the only club where he played for 15 years, winning 5 titles. He also played for the Argentina national team, winning the Taça das Nações (Nations Cup) in 1964.

Following the end of his professional sports career, Rattín became involved in politics, and, in 2001, was elected to the National Chamber of Deputies for the Federalist Unity Party list in Buenos Aires.

Biography
A Boca fan since childhood, Rattín joined their youth team, and debuted professionally on September 9, 1956, against Boca's major rival River Plate. Replacing injured Eliseo Mouriño, he had a good game which Boca won 2–1. Slowly he became the team's steady "number 5", and won the hearts of the fans with his sober and solid playing abilities.

In his fourteen-year professional career, Rattín played only for Boca Juniors, winning the Argentine championship in 1962, 1964 and 1965, and the Nacional in 1969. In the same year, he won the 1969 Copa Argentina

With the Argentina national football team Antonio Rattín played thirty-two times, including the 1962 FIFA World Cup, and as the captain in the 1966 FIFA World Cup that took place in England.

It was in the quarter-final match against the host team that Rattín was sent off by the German referee Rudolf Kreitlein for "violence of the tongue", despite the referee speaking no Spanish. Rattín was so incensed with the decision, believing the referee to be biased in favour of England, that he initially refused to leave. As a way to show his disgust, he sat on the red carpet which was exclusively for the Queen to walk on. He eventually had to be escorted from the field by two policemen and as a final sign of disgust he wrinkled a British pennant before he was escorted out. This incident, and others surrounding the same game, arguably started the long-lasting rivalry between both national teams - but, on the other hand, allowed for the institution of yellow and red cards into the football practice, a solution devised by FIFA after the spark that set off the incident.

After a total of 357 matches and 28 goals with Boca Juniors, Rattín retired from professional football in 1970. He worked as coach of the youth teams of Boca Juniors, and coached the first division teams of Gimnasia y Esgrima de La Plata in 1977 and 1979, and Boca Juniors in 1980.

In 1978 Rattin was briefly employed by Sheffield United as a scout as part of the club's attempts to tap into the emerging South American market. He was partly responsible for bringing Alejandro Sabella to Bramall Lane but no other players followed and the partnership was quietly ended shortly afterwards.

In 2001, Rattín was elected to the Argentine Chamber of Deputies for the conservative Federalist Unity Party, led by alleged torturer Luis Patti. He was the first footballer to enter Congress and was chairman of the Sports Committee. He stepped down in 2005.

Titles

Club
Boca Juniors
 Primera División (4): 1962, 1964, 1965, 1969 Nacional
 Copa Argentina (1): 1969

National team
Argentina
 Taça das Nações (1): 1964

Bibliography
Antonio Ubaldo Rattín - El Caudillo, by Alfredo Di Salvo - Autores Editores (publisher) -

References

External links

Informe Xeneize biography 
 
 

1937 births
Living people
Argentina international footballers
Members of the Argentine Chamber of Deputies elected in Buenos Aires
Boca Juniors footballers
Argentine Primera División players
1962 FIFA World Cup players
1966 FIFA World Cup players
Argentine football managers
Boca Juniors managers
Sportspeople from Buenos Aires Province
Argentine people of Italian descent
Sheffield United F.C. non-playing staff
Federalist Unity Party politicians
Association football midfielders
Argentine footballers